Aramoun (also spelled Aaramoun or ′Aramun) is a town and municipality located in the Keserwan District of the Keserwan-Jbeil Governorate of Lebanon. It has an average elevation of 730 meters above sea level and a total land area of 148 hectares. 
Aramoun's inhabitants are Maronites.

History

In 1838, Eli Smith noted  Aramun as a village located in "Aklim el-Kesrawan, Northeast of Beirut; the chief seat of the Maronites".

In 1959, an Ariana Airlines plane crashed just moments after taking off from the nearby Beirut International airport. The flight, Flight 202 was going to Iran and then to Afghanistan.

References

Bibliography

 

Populated places in Keserwan District
Maronite Christian communities in Lebanon